Morlaix Communauté is the agglomeration community, an intercommunal structure, centred on the city of Morlaix. It is located in the Finistère department, in the Brittany region, western France. Its area is 680.3 km2. Its population was 64,438 in 2018, of which 14,729 in Morlaix proper.

Member communes
The Morlaix Communauté consists of the following 26 communes:

 Botsorhel
 Carantec
 Le Cloître-Saint-Thégonnec
 Garlan
 Guerlesquin
 Guimaëc
 Henvic
 Lanmeur
 Lannéanou
 Locquénolé
 Locquirec
 Morlaix
 Pleyber-Christ
 Plouégat-Guérand
 Plouégat-Moysan
 Plouezoc'h
 Plougasnou
 Plougonven
 Plouigneau
 Plounéour-Ménez
 Plourin-lès-Morlaix
 Saint-Jean-du-Doigt
 Saint-Martin-des-Champs
 Saint-Thégonnec Loc-Eguiner
 Sainte-Sève
 Taulé

References

External links
 Morlaix Communauté website

Agglomeration communities in France
Intercommunalities of Finistère